Gary Andrew Naysmith (born 16 November 1978) is a Scottish football coach and former player, who is currently the manager of Scottish League Two side Stenhousemuir. 

Naysmith, who played as a left-back or left-winger, started his senior career with Hearts. Naysmith moved to England to sign with Premier League club Everton, where he stayed for seven seasons. Naysmith was capped 46 times by the Scotland national team between 2000 and 2009. After spells with Sheffield United and Huddersfield Town, Naysmith returned to Scotland with Aberdeen.

In the summer of 2013, Naysmith signed with part-time club East Fife, and was then appointed as player-manager in December. He managed Championship club Queen of the South from December 2016 to May 2019. He was appointed manager of Edinburgh City in March 2021, but was sacked a year later. Naysmith became Stenhousemuir manager in January 2023.

Playing career

Club

Heart of Midlothian
Naysmith started his senior career with Hearts, whom he joined from local side Whitehill's Colts team. Naysmith made his professional debut, aged only 17, several months later in a League Cup tie with Celtic. His opportunity arose from a suspension crisis, the Maroons having no fewer than four defenders (Bruno, Weir, Ritchie and Pointon) sent off in their previous match at Rangers. Despite the patchwork nature of their defence, Hearts defeated Celtic 1–0, with Naysmith earning plaudits for his mature display. Within a year he had established himself as the side's first-choice left back, displacing Neil Pointon, and in 1998 helped the Tynecastle club end their 36-year trophy drought by lifting the Scottish Cup. That season he was also named Scottish PFA Young Player of the Year.

A transitional season followed as the loss of Weir, McCann (both transferred) and Colin Cameron (injured) destabilised the side. Naysmith himself had to adapt to a change in the levels of expectation placed upon him, no longer allowed the defence of youthful naïveté. By the 1999–2000 season he had rediscovered his confidence and was being touted for an international call-up. A particular highlight of that season was his display in a 3–2 defeat of Celtic at Parkhead in February 2000. Hearts had trailed 2–0 before battling back to victory, with Naysmith striking a spectacular equalising goal.

As one of Hearts' most valuable assets, Naysmith was also the subject of transfer speculation. Financial concerns at the club heightened these and in October 2000 it appeared that Naysmith was bound for the West Midlands when Coventry City bid for him. However, their offer was bettered by Everton at the eleventh hour, and Naysmith moved to Merseyside instead, in a £1.7 million deal.

Everton
Naysmith first became a regular under Walter Smith and then remained under his successor David Moyes. His early performances led to Everton fans nicknaming "El Blanco Carlos", after the Brazilian left-back Roberto Carlos. He made 152 appearances for Everton, scoring six goals, although his Everton career was disrupted by injury. In December 2002 he was the victim of a "blood curdling, x-rated" tackle by Liverpool's Steven Gerrard. A long term ankle injury in 2005 meant that Naysmith lost his first-team place at Everton to Alessandro Pistone in the 2004–05 season, and in the 2005–06 season Portuguese international Nuno Valente claimed the left back slot at Goodison Park.

Naysmith recovered from ankle surgery in time for the start of the 2006–07 season and an injury to Valente in the season's opening game saw him restored to the starting eleven. He kept his place after Valente returned to fitness, however it was not long before injury befell him again, a medial ligament strain in the game against Newcastle United on 24 September 2006 keeping him out for two months.

At the end of the 2004–05 season, he signed a new three-year contract with the Blues. On 5 May 2007, Naysmith scored the third goal in a 3–0 victory over Portsmouth The win practically guaranteed that Everton would be playing in Europe during the 2007–08 season. Naysmith made over 130 Premier League appearances for the Toffees before leaving the club to join Championship side Sheffield United for £1 million in July 2007 as part of an exchange deal with Phil Jagielka.

Sheffield United
As part of the deal that took Phil Jagielka to Goodison Park, Naysmith was given permission to speak to Sheffield United to discuss a possible move. He was signed by The Blades and agreed a three-year deal at Bramall Lane, thus ending a six-and-half-year stay with Everton.

Naysmith made his first team début in the opening game of the 2007–08 season in a 2–2 home draw with Colchester United and quickly cemented his place in the side becoming the first choice at left back throughout the rest of the season. Naysmith started 42 games in his first season, 38 of them in the league.

Naysmith started the 2008–09 season as first choice left back, playing 43 games until he suffered serious cruciate ligament damage which ruled him out for the final weeks of the season, thus missing the club's unsuccessful play-off campaign. He made his first start of the season on the opening day in United's 1–0 loss at Birmingham City. Naysmith started 37 league games and made a further two appearances from the bench.

Due to an injury suffered towards the end of the 2008–09 season, Naysmith missed the majority of the 2009–10 season. He returned to the side in December 2009 and was listed as an unused substitute three times before making a successful return to the side for the last two games of the season, the first in The Blades 2–0 win over Swansea City, the second in their final day 3–0 win over Ipswich Town.

Huddersfield Town
Naysmith rejected a new deal at Bramall Lane, opting to sign a two-year deal with Yorkshire neighbours Huddersfield Town on 4 June 2010 on a free transfer. Naysmith revealed that he turned down offers from Premier League clubs where he would have had the chance to be a squad player to move to the Galpharm Stadium.

On 7 August 2010, Naysmith debuted for the Terriers in the 3–0 win versus Notts County at Meadow Lane. On 14 August 2010, Naysmith was then sent-off in his home debut for the Terriers versus Tranmere Rovers, as the match ended in a 0–0 draw. On 25 August 2010, Naysmith then suffered a toe injury in a League Cup second round 5–1 away defeat at his former club Everton, which caused him to miss the next five months of the season, as he eventually returned to play in a 2–0 home win versus Carlisle United in the league.

Naysmith departed the club in June 2012 after not being offered a new contract by the Terriers manager, Simon Grayson.

Aberdeen
Naysmith returned to Scotland to train with Aberdeen in July 2012, joining the club on a pre-season tour of Germany. After a successful trial and impressing in games against Werder Bremen and FC St. Pauli, Naysmith signed a one-year deal on 1 August, but expressed a desire to earn an extension beyond the summer. On the opening day of the 2012–13 season, Aberdeen faced SPL champions Celtic. Naysmith was named in the starting team that narrowly lost out 1–0 at Celtic Park. It was announced on 13 May 2013 that Naysmith's contract along with another six players would not be extended.

International
Naysmith represented Scotland at under-21, B and full international levels. He made his full Scotland debut in May 2000, in a 2–1 victory over the Republic of Ireland in Dublin, and earned 46 caps up to 2009. His only international goal arrived in 2002, during a UEFA Euro 2004 qualification game versus Iceland; he scored the second goal in a 2–0 win, with a right-footed volley from the edge of the penalty area.

Naysmith also represented Scotland B on one occasion on 20 May 2003, in a 2–1 home win versus Northern Ireland B.

Coaching career

East Fife
On 31 October 2013 Naysmith agreed to stay with League One East Fife until the end of the season in a player-assistant manager role. When manager Willie Aitchison left the club on 28 November, Naysmith was made caretaker manager, and was subsequently appointed as manager on a permanent basis on 18 December.

On 1 December 2016 and after three and a half seasons as player-manager of part-time club East Fife, Naysmith signed for Scottish Championship club Queen of the South as their new manager to go full-time in Dumfries.

Naysmith's intention was to finish his playing career and his time as the Methil club's player-manager by taking charge of the club's Scottish Cup replay against Edinburgh City on 5 December 2016. However, as the match was postponed until 7 December 2016, Naysmith departed East Fife earlier than planned to be in charge of Queens' league match versus St Mirren on 6 December 2016 instead.

Queen of the South
Naysmith signed a contract with Scottish Championship club Queen of the South on 1 December 2016. After becoming team manager in the following week, Naysmith decided to end his playing career.

Naysmith was named Scottish Championship Manager of the Month for January 2019. On 4 May 2019, after the Doonhamers were defeated 3–0 at home versus Partick Thistle and finished in the relegation play-off place in the Scottish Championship, Naysmith parted company with the Dumfries club.

In August 2019, Naysmith returned to Hearts in a newly created role of managing players loaned out to other clubs.

Edinburgh City
Naysmith was appointed manager of Scottish League Two club Edinburgh City in March 2021. He was sacked in March 2022, with the team sitting in 4th place of the 2021–22 Scottish League Two table.

Stenhousemuir 
On 3 January 2023, Naysmith was named as the new manager of Scottish League Two side Stenhousemuir.

Career statistics

Club

International appearances

International goals
Scores and results list Scotland's goal tally first.

Managerial record

 Edinburgh City statistics include forfeit win over Falkirk in the Scottish League Cup on 21 July 2021.
 Initially caretaker of East Fife and appointed permanently on 18 December 2013.

Honours and achievements

Player

Heart of Midlothian
Scottish Cup: 1997–98

Huddersfield Town
Football League One play-offs: 2011–12

East Fife
Scottish League Two: 2015–16

Scotland
Kirin Cup (1): 2006

Manager

East Fife
Scottish League Two: 2015–16

References

External links

Falkirk forfeit tie at Edinburgh City

1978 births
Living people
People from Loanhead
Scottish footballers
Association football fullbacks
Scotland international footballers
Scotland under-21 international footballers
Scotland B international footballers
Heart of Midlothian F.C. players
Everton F.C. players
Sheffield United F.C. players
Huddersfield Town A.F.C. players
Aberdeen F.C. players
Premier League players
English Football League players
Scottish Football League players
Scottish Premier League players
Tynecastle F.C. players
People educated at Lasswade High School Centre
East Fife F.C. players
Scottish football managers
East Fife F.C. managers
Queen of the South F.C. managers
Scottish Professional Football League managers
Scottish Professional Football League players
Heart of Midlothian F.C. non-playing staff
Sportspeople from Midlothian
F.C. Edinburgh managers
Stenhousemuir F.C. managers